The Pratt & Whitney Canada PT6 is a turboprop aircraft engine produced by Pratt & Whitney Canada.

Its design was started in 1958, it first ran in February 1960, first flew on 30 May 1961, entered service in 1964 and has been continuously updated since.

It consists of two basic sections: a gas generator with accessory gearbox and a free power turbine with reduction gearbox, and is often seemingly mounted backwards in an aircraft in so far as the intake is at the rear and the exhaust at the front.

Many variants of the PT6 have been produced, not only as turboprops but also as turboshaft engines for helicopters, land vehicles, hovercraft, and boats; as auxiliary power units; and for industrial uses. By November 2015, 51,000 had been produced, had logged 400 million flight hours from 1963 to 2016. It is known for its reliability with an in-flight shutdown rate of 1 per 651,126 hours in 2016.

The PT6A covers the power range between  while the PT6B/C are turboshaft variants for helicopters.

Development

In 1956, Pratt & Whitney Canada's (PWC) president, Ronald Riley, ordered engineering manager Dick Guthrie to hire a team of gas turbine specialists to design a small gas turbine engine. Demand for the Wasp radial engine was still strong and its production was profitable but the aim was to become Canada's prime engine company by focusing on a small gas turbine engine. Riley gave Guthrie a modest budget of C$100,000. Guthrie recruited twelve engineers with experience gained at various places including the National Research Council in Ottawa, Orenda Engines in Ontario, Bristol Aero Engines and Blackburn Aircraft. They completed the detailed design of an engine for Canadair's small jet trainer, the CL-41. It was a  thrust turbojet but the design was taken over by P&WA who developed it into the Pratt & Whitney JT12. The team had to wait for market assessments to define their next engine, a  turboprop for twin-engined aircraft, the PT6. The early development of the PT-6, which first ran in December 1963, was beset with engineering problems, cost overruns and lack of sales. It was almost cancelled. The team lacked the ability to deal with the technical difficulties, i.e. how to develop the engine, because, as one of the team Elvie Smith recalled, they came from research and design backgrounds. They learned how to run a development program, such as testing around the clock rather than on one shift, from a PWA team which directed the development for several months.

The PT-6 first flew on 30 May 1961, mounted as a third engine in the nose of a Beech 18 aircraft which had been converted by de Havilland at its Downsview facility in North York, Ontario. Full-scale production started in 1963, with service entry the following year. The Beech 18 continued as a PT6 and propeller flying test-bed until it was replaced with a Beech King Air in 1980. The King Air test-engine or propeller replaced one of the standard ones. In 1974 the Beech 18 had been unable to fly fast enough and high enough to test the PT6A-50 for the de Havilland Canada Dash 7 so a Vickers Viscount was modified as a PT6 test-bed with a Dash-7 installation in the nose.

The first production PT-6 model, the PT6A-6, was certificated in December 1963. The first application was the Beech Queen Air, enticing the U.S. Army to buy a fleet of the U-21 Ute variant. This helped launch the King Air with Beechcraft selling about 7,000 by 2012.  
From 1963 to 2016 power-to-weight ratio was improved by 50%, brake specific fuel consumption by 20% and overall pressure ratio reached 14:1.
Its development continues and while today its basic configuration is the same as in 1964, updates have included a cooled first-stage turbine vane, additional compressor and turbine stages and single-crystal turbine blades in the early 1990s. Its pressure ratio is 13:1 in the AgustaWestland AW609 tiltrotor, the highest that can be used without cooled turbine blades.

In response to the General Electric GE93, in 2017 Pratt & Whitney Canada started testing core technology and systems for a proposed  engine to replace the most powerful versions of the PT6.
It was considered likely to be a development of the PT6C core, and would fit between the  PT6C-67C/E and the  PW100 family. It was expected to be ready to launch by the end of 2017 for an initial helicopter platform with a 10-15% reduction in brake specific fuel consumption.
This 2,000 hp engine would target a possible new market such as a Super PC-12, a more powerful TBM, or a bigger King Air.

PW100 
When de Havilland Canada asked for a much larger engine for the DHC-8, roughly twice the power of the Large PT6, Pratt & Whitney Canada responded with a new design initially known as the PT7, later renamed Pratt & Whitney Canada PW100.

Design

The rate at which parts deteriorate in a gas turbine is unbalanced insofar as the hottest parts need replacing or repairing more often than the cooler-running parts. If the hotter parts can be removed without disturbing the rest of the engine, for example without removing the complete engine from the aircraft, maintenance costs are reduced. It was achieved with the PT6 by having the hottest parts, the gas generator turbine and combustor, at the propeller end. They are removed without disturbing the rest of the engine with its connections to the aircraft. This arrangement was patented by designer Newland, one of the original PT6 team. A similar general arrangement with a free-turbine power take-off at the exhaust end (the  P.181 engine) had been shown by Armstrong Siddeley Motors at the Farnborough Airshow in 1957.

An early design improvement, incorporated in the PT6A-20, was the pipe diffuser patented by Vrana, another of the original PT6 team. It replaced the vaned type diffuser used in centrifugal compressors. The pipe diffuser became standard design practice for P&WC. Another design change improved the part-speed functioning of the compressor. It is common to bleed air from a compressor to make it work properly at low engine speeds. The PT6 has a bleed arrangement which reuses the bleed air by returning it in a tangential direction at the entry to the compressor, an idea patented by Schaum et al. and titled "Turbine Engine With Induced Pre-Swirl at Compressor Inlet". It acts like a variable vane and is known as a "Jet-Flap".

All versions of the engine consist of two sections that can be easily separated for maintenance: a gas generator supplies hot pressurized gas to a free power turbine. The starter has to accelerate only the gas generator, making the engine easy to start, particularly in cold weather. Air enters the gas-generator through an inlet screen into the low-pressure axial compressor. This has three stages on small and medium versions of the engine and four stages on large versions. The air then flows into a single-stage centrifugal compressor, through a folded annular combustion chamber, and finally through a single-stage turbine that powers the compressors at about 45,000 rpm. Hot gas from the gas generator flows into the power turbine, which turns at about 30,000 rpm. It has one stage on the small engines and two stages on the medium and large ones. For turboprop use, this powers a two-stage planetary output reduction gearbox, which turns the propeller at a speed of 1,900 to 2,200 rpm. The exhaust gas then escapes through two side-mounted ducts in the power turbine housing. The turbines are concentric with the combustion chamber, reducing overall length.

In most aircraft installations the PT6 is mounted so that the intake end of the engine is towards the rear of the aircraft, leading to it being known by many as the "back-to-front" engine. This places the power section at the front of the nacelle, where it can drive the propeller directly without the need for a long shaft. Intake air is usually fed to the engine via an underside mounted duct, and the two exhaust outlets are directed rearward. This arrangement aids maintenance by allowing the entire power section to be removed along with the propeller, exposing the gas-generator section. To facilitate rough-field operations, foreign objects are diverted from the compressor intake by inertial separators in the inlet. In some installation such as the PT6A-66B version in the Piaggio Avanti P180, the engine is reversed, with the propeller acting as a "pusher", the accessory gearbox facing the front of the aircraft.

Operational history

By the 40th anniversary of its maiden flight in 2001, over 36,000 PT6As had been delivered, not including the other versions.
Up to October 2003, 31,606 delivered engines have flown more than 252 million hours.
Till November 2015, 51,000 have been produced.
The family logged 400 million flight hours from 1963 to 2016.

The PT6 family is known for its reliability with an in-flight shutdown rate of 1 per 333,333 hours up to October 2003,
1 per 127,560 hours in 2005 in Canada,
1 per 333,000 hours from 1963 to 2016,
1 per 651,126 hours over 12 months in 2016.
Time between overhauls is between 3,600 and 9,000 hours and hot-section inspections between 1,800 and 2,000 hours.

Early PT6 versions lacked a FADEC, autothrottle could be installed as an aftermarket upgrade with an actuator, initially for single-engine aircraft like the PC-12 and potentially in twin-turboprop aircraft.
In October 2019 the PT6 E-Series was launched on the PC-12 NGX, the first general aviation turboprop with an electronic propeller and engine control system with a single lever and better monitoring for longer maintenance intervals, increased from 300 to 600 hours, and a TBO increased by 43% to 5,000 hours, reducing engine operating costs by at least 15%.
In April 2022, Daher announced that the updated SOCATA TBM-960 would be powered by the PT6E-66XT.

Variants

The PT6B and PT6C are turboshaft variants for helicopters.
In US military use, they are designated as T74 or T101.

Several other versions of the PT6 have appeared over time :
 the PT6B is a helicopter turboshaft model, featuring an offset reduction gearbox with a freewheeling clutch and power turbine governor, producing  at 4,500 rpm.
 the PT6C is a helicopter model, with a single side-mounted exhaust, producing  at 30,000 rpm, which is stepped down in a user-supplied gearbox.
 the PT6E is a large PT6A derivative equipped with digital engine control.
the PT6T Twin-Pac consists of two PT6 engines driving a common-output reduction gearbox, producing almost  at 6,000 rpm.
 the ST6 is a version intended for stationary applications, originally developed for the UAC TurboTrain, and now widely used as auxiliary power units on large aircraft, as well as many other roles.

The PT6A family is a series of free-turbine turboprop engines providing 

T74-CP-700
(PT6A-20) United States military designation for the PT6A-20/27, used in the Beechcraft U-21 Ute.
T74-CP-702
(PT6A-29) 
T101
United States military designation for the T101-CP-100 / PT6A-45R, used in the Shorts 330 and Shorts C-23 Sherpa.
PT6B-9
The PT6B-9 is a  turboshaft engine for use in helicopters.
PT6B-16
PT6C
The PT6C is a  engine for helicopters and tiltrotors.
PT6D-114A
The PT6D-114A is based on the PT6A-114A. The main difference is the deletion of the second-stage reduction gearing and output shaft, because the engine is intended for integration with a combining gearbox incorporating power turbine governors and a propeller output shaft.
Soloy Dual Pac2x PT6D-114A engines driving a single propeller through a combining gearbox, capable of independent operation.
PT6T
Twin PT6 power units combining outputs through a gearbox for use in helicopters.
ST6
The ST6 is a variant of the PT6 that was originally developed as a powerplant for the UAC TurboTrain power cars, but later developed as a stationary power generator and auxiliary power unit.
ST6B
The ST6B-62 was a 550 bhp (410 kW) version of the PT6 developed for use in the STP-Paxton Turbocar, raced in the 1967 Indianapolis 500.
STN 6/76
The STN 6/76 was a 500 bhp (370 kW) version of the PT6 developed for use in the Lotus 56, raced in the 1968 Indianapolis 500 and later in Formula One races, in 1971.

Applications
The engine is used in over 100 different applications.

PT6A

 AASI Jetcruzer
 Aero Commander 680T (PT6 conversion)
 Aero Ae 270 Ibis
 AHRLAC Holdings Ahrlac
 Air Tractor AT-400
 Air Tractor AT-501
 Air Tractor AT-602
 Air Tractor AT-802
 Antilles Super Goose
 Antonov An-28
 Ayres Turbo Thrush
 Basler BT-67
 Beechcraft 1900
 Beechcraft Model 99
 Beechcraft A36TC Bonanza (turbine conversion)
 Beechcraft C-12 Huron
 Beechcraft King Air
 Beechcraft Lightning
 Beech 18 series (turbine conversion)
 Beechcraft Model 87
 Beechcraft Model 99
 Beechcraft RC-12 Guardrail
 Beechcraft RU-21C Ute
 Beechcraft Starship
 Beechcraft Super King Air
 Beechcraft T-6 Texan II
 Beechcraft T-34C Turbo-Mentor
 Beechcraft T-44 Pegasus
 Beriev Be-30K
 Calidus B-250
 CASA C-212 series 300P
 Cessna 208 Caravan
 Cessna P210N (turbine conversion)
 Cessna 404 Titan (turbine conversion)
 Cessna 421C Golden Eagle (turbine conversion)
 Cessna 425 Corsair/Conquest I
 Conair Turbo Firecat
 Conroy Tri-Turbo-Three
 de Havilland Canada DHC-2 Mk. III Turbo Beaver
 de Havilland Canada DHC-2T Turbo Beaver
 de Havilland Canada DHC-3 Otter (turbine conversions)
 de Havilland Canada DHC-6 Twin Otter
 de Havilland Canada Dash 7
 Dominion UV-23 Scout
 Dornier Do 128 Turbo Skyservant
 Dornier Seawings Seastar
 Douglas DC-3 (turbine conversions)
 Epic LT Dynasty
 Embraer EMB 110 Bandeirante
 Embraer EMB 121 Xingu
 Embraer EMB 312 Tucano
 Embraer EMB 314 Super Tucano
 Frakes Mohawk 298
 Frakes Turbocat
 Gulfstream American Hustler 400
 Grumman Mallard (turbine conversion)
 Grumman Goose (turbine conversion)
 Harbin Y-12
 Helio AU-24 Stallion
 IAI Arava
 IAI Eitan
 Indonesian Aerospace N-219
 JetPROP DLX
 Kestrel K-350
 KAI KT-1
 Let L-410 Turbolet
 Lancair Evolution
 NAL Saras
 NDN Fieldmaster
 FTS Turbo Firecracker
 PAC 750XL
 PAC Cresco
 Piaggio P.180 Avanti
 Pilatus PC-6/B Turbo-Porter
 Pilatus PC-7
 Pilatus PC-9
 Pilatus PC-12
 Pilatus PC-21
 Piper PA-31P (turbine conversion)
 Piper PA-31T Cheyenne
 Piper PA-42 Cheyenne III
 Piper PA-46-500TP Meridian
 Piper T1040
 PZL-130T Turbo Orlik and PZL-130TC-II Orlik
 PZL M-18 Dromader (turbine conversion)
 PZL M28 Skytruck
 Quest Kodiak
 Reims-Cessna F406 Caravan II
 Saunders ST-27/ST-28
 Scaled Composites ATTT
 Shorts 330
 Shorts 360
 Short C-23 Sherpa
 Socata TBM
 Spectrum SA-550
 Swearingen SA26-T Merlin IIA
 US Aircraft A-67 Dragon
 TAI Hürkuş
  Baykar Bayraktar Akıncı-B

PT6B
 AgustaWestland AW119 Koala
 Avicopter AC313
 Changhe Z-8F
 Lockheed XH-51
 Sikorsky S-76B
 Westland Lynx 606

PT6C
 Airbus Helicopters H175/Avicopter Z-15
 AgustaWestland AW139
 AgustaWestland AW609
 Bell UH-1 Global Eagle upgrade

PT6D
 Soloy Pathfinder 21

PT6E
 Pilatus PC-12NGX

ST6
 UAC TurboTrain
 STP-Paxton Turbocar Indy racer

STN
 Lotus 56 USAC and Formula 1 racing car

Engines on display

 New England Air Museum, Connecticut (cutaway)

Specifications (PT6A-6)

See also

References

External links

 
 
 
 
 

1960s turboprop engines
Pratt & Whitney Canada aircraft engines
Mixed-compressor gas turbines